The Book of Ebon Bindings is a 1978 fantasy role-playing game supplement.

Contents
The Book of Ebon Bindings is a handbook of demonology for Tekumel, outlining the more famous demons of that plane of reality.

Reception
Frederick Paul Kiesche III reviewed The Book of Ebon Bindings in Space Gamer No. 71. Kiesche commented that "This book is another fascinating facet of the EPT/S&G game universe, and one well worth exploring if you're not faint of heart!"

Reviews
White Wolf #34 (Jan./Feb., 1993)

References

Fantasy role-playing game supplements
Role-playing game supplements introduced in 1978
Tékumel